Vesna Perić (Belgrade, 1972) is a Serbian dramaturge, screenwriter, film critic, theorist and prose writer.  She is the editor-in-chief of the national Drama Program of Radio Belgrade. She is a PHD of film and media studies.

Biography 
 Education

She finished elementary school and high school in Belgrade, as well as elementary music school "Mokranjac" (department of violin).  She studied the Faculty of Civil Engineering in Belgrade.  She graduated from the Faculty of Dramatic Arts in Belgrade in 2003 at the Department of Dramaturgy.

With thesis Memory and the film romantic comedy: deconstruction of narrative temporality she obtained her master's degree at the Film and Media Studies Group of FDA in 2009,  and she had doctoral thesis Theory of Narrative Structures in Post-Yugoslav Film from 1994 to 2008 (under mentorship of prof. Nevena Daković).

 Career
Since 2002, she has been working as a film critic and journalist at the Second Program of Radio Belgrade, where she has been the editor-in-chief of the Drama Program since 2010.  She is the author of eleven radio dramas broadcast on Radio Belgrade. She is the author of the dramatic text What is her fault, nothing is her fault at all awarded at the Hartefakt Competition for Best Social Awareness  Drama of 2012 (premiering in 2015 at Bitef Theater directed by Anđelka Nikolić).

Her short stories were published in the anthologies of Earthly Gifts ("Everything about My Grandma" and the Long Sky Passenger ("Color of an Apparition" ) dedicated to Ivo Andrić and Miloš Crnjanski (Laguna publishing house, 2012 and 2013), as well as in The stories about Savamala ( "The pleasure to be alone", Arhipelag 2013), in the ProFemina magazines, the Belgrade Literary Magazine and the Charter, as well as on the Art Anima portal.  The stories were published in English - Hourglass ("Besa") and Best European Fiction 2019 ("What she's done"), Dalkey Press, as well as in the German language -  (Play it again, Cage) and perspectives ("").

As an active film critic, she published film reviews and essays in the cultural supplement of Politika (2007-2018) and occasionally cooperates with Chronicles of FEST.  She is a member of the Serbian branch of FIPRESCI .

Literary and film essays were published in the journal Ulaznica: "The end of humanism in the antiutopian trilogy of Rabidness, Atlantis and 1999 by Borislav Pekić", "The Jung's Term of Synchronicity and Non-Linear Dramaturgy in Cinematic Works" ("")

As a screenwriter she is featured in the "Awakening" anthology /Buđenje/, which brought together female comic writers and artists from the region (Dibidus, Belgrade, 2018).  She was screenwriter of children's educational program "Film Graffiti" (Filmski grafiti, RTS, 2002).

She publishes theoretical papers on the film in the Proceedings of the Faculty of Dramatic Arts and the magazines Limes and Kultura.  She worked as a free copywriter.

A variant of her PHD thesis is published as Trauma and post-Yugoslav cinema: Narrative strategies (Film center of Serbia, 2019).

Radio drama 
 You, crocodile of my soul: A.  P.  Chekhov /Krokodilu duše moje: A. P. Čehov/
 A miracle ring /Čudotvorni prsten/
 Save your waltz for me: Scott Fitzgerald /Sačuvaj valcer za mene: Skot Ficdžerald/
 Existence, gigantic and voluptuous: P.  P.  Njegoš /Žiće, gigantsko i sladostrastno: P. P. Njegoš/
 The life and works of the immortal Uncle Ilija Stanojević /Život i dela besmrtnog Čiča Ilije Stanojevića/
 Archangel of History: Gavrilo Princip /Arhanđeo istorije: Gavrilo Princip/
 We have only a few winters on this Earth /Na zemlji smo samo nekoliko zima/
 Black Star: David Bowie /Crna zvezda: Dejvid Bouvi/
 Fifteen minutes of glory: Andy Warhol /Petnaest minuta slave: Endi Vorhol/
 Sixty Eight: Youth is our privilege /Šezdeset osma: Mladost je naša privilegija/
 Apostle of solitude: Isidora Sekulić /Apostolka samoće: Isidora Sekulić/

References

External links 
 Vladislav Stojičić.  "Vesna Perić: The Time We Live I feel as a Post-Human" (an interview), P-portal, Zagreb, March 30, 2017 (Serbian)
 Professional and scientific papers by Vesna Perić at Academia.edu
 Vesna Perić on IMDb site (in English)
 Radovanović, Rade.  "I think, therefore, I remember" , Danas , Belgrade, October 1, 2016.
 Perić, Vesna.  I think (so) I remember (drama, 2001), Rastko Project, 2010.
 Sixty Eight: Youth is our privilege (two-part documentary drama).  Part One, Part Two, Radio Belgrade
 Apostle of solitude: Isidora Sekulić (drama), Radio Belgrade
 

1972 births
Serbian dramatists and playwrights
Writers from Belgrade
Serbian screenwriters
Serbian theatre critics
Serbian producers
Serbian comics writers
University of Belgrade Faculty of Dramatic Arts alumni
Living people
Serbian women editors
Radio editors
Serbian film critics